The  (Literally: Osaka East Line) is a railway line in Osaka, Japan, operated by the West Japan Railway Company (JR-West). The line connects Ōsaka Station in northern Osaka with Kyūhōji Station in Yao, forming an arc around the northern and eastern suburbs of the city. Before being named on August 23, 2007, the line was constructed with the tentative name "". 

JR-West and JR Freight operate trains as Category-2 railway business. The Kita-Umeda extension opened on March 18, 2023, replacing the above-ground Umeda Freight Line.

History 
Conceived in the 1950s during Japan's explosive postwar economic growth, it was planned as a grand "outer loop"  of the city, using existing freight lines to link Amagasaki with Shin-Osaka, Suita, Awaji, Hanaten, Kami, Uriwari and Sugimotochō, with a newly constructed segment into Osaka's (then primarily industrial) Nankō Port Town. However, with JNR's financial situation deteriorating catastrophically (culminating in its privatization) and continuing issues surrounding land acquisition and squatting by local residents on railway property, the plan was cut back to Shin-Osaka and Kami, terminating at Kyūhōji in the south. (The Hanwa Freight Line, which would have carried the southern segment from Kami to Sugimotochō, was officially abandoned by JR Freight in 2009.) The line connects Shin-Osaka Station in northern Osaka with Kyūhōji Station in Yao, forming an arc around the northern and eastern suburbs of the city.

The southern part opened on 15 March 2008. But because of problems with the illegal occupation of a site, construction of the northern part was delayed. Construction of the northern segment started in 2011 and the section between Shin-Osaka and Hanaten has opened on 16 March 2019.

Incorporated into the second phase of the Osaka Higashi Line project is the construction of underground platforms at Osaka Station (known as Umekita). The project provides the basis for the future Naniwasuji Line while also providing a small shortcut on current services on the Haruka and Kuroshio limited express trains.

In February 2023, track switching work took place between the 11th and 13th of that month. The underground platforms began operation later in the year on 18 March.

Stations
● : Direct Rapid service stops here
| : Direct Rapid service does not stop here

Notes

Rolling stock

Passenger
 207 series (used for Direct Rapid Services since March 12, 2011)
 321 series (used for Direct Rapid Services)
 221 series (from 12 March 2022)

Former
 103 series (until 2018) 
 201 series (until 11 March 2022)
 223-6000 series (used for Direct Rapid Services from March 15, 2008, until March 11, 2011)

The 103 and 201 series trains are based at Nara Depot, the 207 series trains are based at Aboshi Depot, while the 223-6000 series trains were based at Miyahara Depot.

Freight
Locomotives seen hauling freight trains include the DD51, DE10, EF66, EF81 and EF210.

See also
 Musashino Line, in the Tokyo area
 Aichi Loop Line

References

External links 
 Osaka Soto-Kanjo Railway Co., Ltd. 

Rail transport in Osaka Prefecture
Lines of West Japan Railway Company
Railway lines opened in 1929
1067 mm gauge railways in Japan